Miquelets or Micalets were irregular Catalan and Valencian mountain light troops. They enjoyed a certain prominence in the wars in the Iberian Peninsula during the 17th and 18th centuries, and in peace seem to have on occasion plundered travellers.

Overview
The name is a diminutive of Michael; it is claimed it comes from Miquel or Miquelot de Prats, a Catalan mercenary captain in the service of Cesare Borgia.  The term was used for many unconnected groups of Catalans who took up arms in many wars, as well as in banditry.  The Miquelets were maintained at the parish level, not by the central or the provincial governments, and as they had to turn out for duty on sound of the village alarm-bell (someten) they are frequently called sometents.

In specific wars

The Miquelets were active during the Catalan secessionist revolt of 1640 ("War of the Reapers")

In the War of the Spanish Succession (1701–1714), most of the Miquelets fought on the Austriacist side; they became part of the Army of Catalonia, in 1713, and continued the struggle against the French claimant Philip, Duke of Anjou (Philip V) until long after the peace.

During the Peninsular War, the Miquelets successfully harassed the French occupiers in the mountains of Catalonia, sometimes even participating in operations in large bodies, such as in the Siege of Girona (1809) and other operations around Girona in 1808 and 1809.

Miquelet was a sobriquet used by Catalan soldiers on both sides of these and other wars; the French raised Catalan troops in 1689 in the Revolt of the Barretines, as well as in 1808 in the Peninsular War.

Miquelets in the Americas
Regiments of Miquelets were also integrated in the Spanish army and fought in other places of the Spanish Empire, outside Spain. Fray Junipero Serra's expedition to establish Catholic missions along the California coast was accompanied by detachments of Migueletes in 1769.  The First Free Company of Volunteers of Catalonia, which was composed of Catalan Miquelets, was destined in New Spain. From there, the Company played a crucial role in the Spanish colonization of the Pacific Northwest, building Fort San Miguel, the first formal European settlement in British Columbia, from 1790 to 1792. Its captain, Pere d'Alberní i Teixidor, received military decorations and even was appointed Interim Governor of California in 1800.

Miquelet police in the Basque region
The police forces of the autonomous governments of Biscay (1784–1877) and Gipuzkoa (1796–1936) were known as Miqueletes. Their homologous police forces in Álava and Navarre, called Miñones and Policía foral, managed to survive beyond the Spanish Civil War due to the siding of these provinces with the military uprising.

See also
 Battle of Montjuïc (1641) 
 Battle of Cambrils
 Guerrilla warfare in the Peninsular War
 History of Catalonia
 Free Company of Volunteers of Catalonia

Notes

References

Attribution

Military units and formations of the Early Modern period
Military units and formations of Spain
Military history of Catalonia
Thirty Years' War